"The Spider and the Fly" is a poem by Mary Howitt (1799–1888), published in 1829. The first line of the poem is "'Will you walk into my parlour?' said the Spider to the Fly." The story tells of a cunning spider who entraps a fly into its web through the use of seduction and manipulation. The poem is a cautionary tale against those who use flattery and charm to disguise their true intentions.

The poem was published with the subtitle "A new Version of an old Story" in The New Year’s Gift and Juvenile Souvenir, which has a publication year of 1829 on its title page but, as the title would suggest, was released before New Year’s Day and was reviewed in magazines as early as October 1828.

The opening line is one of the most recognized and quoted first lines in all of English verse. Often misquoted as "Step into my parlour" or "Come into my parlour", it has become an aphorism, often used to indicate a false offer of help or friendship that is in fact a trap. The line has been used and parodied numerous times in various works of fiction.

When Lewis Carroll was reading Alice's Adventures Under Ground for publication as Alice's Adventures in Wonderland, he replaced a negro minstrel song with The Mock Turtle's Song (also known as the "Lobster Quadrille"), a parody of Howitt's poem that mimics the meter and rhyme scheme and parodies the first line, but not the subject matter, of the original.

Text

Adaptations

 Cinema
 1916 film featuring Robert B. Mantell
 1949 British crime film 
 1923 cartoon: theatrical short by Aesop Fables Studio.

 Music
 1930 song by Barbecue Bob
 1938 song by Fats Waller, Andy Razaf, and J. C. Johnson
 1965 song by The Rolling Stones
1989 song by The Cure ("Lullaby") references the poem
 Illustration
 An illustrated version by Tony DiTerlizzi  was a 2003 Caldecott Honor Book.

See also

Cultural depictions of spiders

References

External links
Text of the poem, along with a Lewis Carroll parody of it

1829 poems
English poems
Fictional flies
Spiders in popular culture